Görel Johnsen, later Görel Hanser, was born 21 June 1949 in Skultorp, near Skövde in Sweden. Johnsen started working at the offices of Stig Anderson’s publishing company Sweden Music and the record company Polar Music in September 1969.                                                
         
After a while she became Anderson's secretary. A few years into the 1970s she had become a key figure in the organisation and became Vice President of Polar Music.

During the ABBA years, she handled the contacts with the many labels around the world who released the group’s records. She also became ABBA’s personal manager, dealing with the press and accompanying them on their tours and promotional trips. In the process, she became a personal friend of the individual members. In 1980 she married journalist and photographer Anders Hanser, whom she met while he was covering ABBA for a radio series.

After ABBA’s break-up, Johnsen continued working for Sweden Music and Polar for a few years. In 1987, she started her own company Music & Artist Service Görel Hanser. She and her staff are mainly occupied with handling the practical details concerning Benny Andersson’s work, including the Andersson/Ulvaeus musicals. She also handles matters concerning ABBA-related business on behalf of Björn Ulvaeus and Andersson. In April 2011, she represented ABBA at the 25th anniversary of the Official International ABBA Fan Club in Roosendaal, the Netherlands.

References 

1949 births
Living people
People from Skövde Municipality
Swedish people of Norwegian descent